Scrubwood may refer to:

 Commidendrum rugosum, a flowering plant from St Helena
 Scrubwood, Buckinghamshire, a hamlet in England